Adam Sky may refer to:

 Adamski, British DJ
 Adam Sky (Australian DJ)
 Adam Air, incorporated as PT. Adam SkyConnection Airlines